Bogegrend Station is a small railway station located in the village of Bogo in Vaksdal municipality, Vestland county, Norway. The station was served by two daily departures per direction by the Bergen Commuter Rail until its closure in 2012. The station opened in 1938, and there is no road access to the station, only a walking pathway that leads from the station to the residential area of the village.

External links
 Bogegrend at the Norwegian National Rail Administration

Railway stations in Vaksdal
Railway stations on Bergensbanen
Railway stations opened in 1938